In the National Basketball Association (NBA), a championship ring is awarded to members of the team that win the annual NBA Finals.
Rings are presented to the team's players, coaches, and members of the executive front office. The Los Angeles Lakers and Boston Celtics are tied for the most rings overall with 17 per team. Phil Jackson also has the most as a coach and Bill Russell has the most as a player (11 each).

History
NBA championship rings have been handed out since the first NBA Finals in 1947. In the modern era, the rings are handed to the defending champions during the team's first home game each season.

Design
NBA championship rings are silver or gold and include the following features:
Team name and symbol
Year the team won the championship
Player name
NBA logo 
"World Champions"

Players and coaches with most championships
List of NBA players with most championships
List of NBA championship head coaches

Other commemorative items
In three NBA Finals, John Havlicek chose two wrist watches and a liqueur tray set as commemorative items.

See also

MLS Cup ring
World Series ring
List of NBA champions
Larry O'Brien Championship Trophy

References

External links
NBA.com: List of champions

Championship rings
Championship ring
Championship ring